The Bedford S is a heavy lorry produced in Great Britain between 1950 and 1959.

Description
The S was launched at the Commercial Vehicle Show in 1950.

Propulsion
At introduction, the lorry was fitted with a  6-cylinder Bedford petrol engine that produced  at 3200 rpm. Drive was through a four-speed manual gearbox featuring synchromesh on the top three gears, and final drive in the rear axle was by hypoid gears. The Perkins R6 diesel engine was made an option in 1953, soon joined by the Leyland O.350, and Bedford's own diesel in 1957.

Use
The Bedford S was used extensively by haulers and general trades through the 1950s and 1960s. The chassis was used for fire engines and to carry the first liquid egg tanker.

See also
Bedford RL
Bedford SB
Green Goddess

References

S type